Neutral and basic amino acid transport protein rBAT is a protein that in humans is encoded by the SLC3A1 gene.

Mutations in the SLC3A1 gene are associated with cystinuria.

See also 
 Heterodimeric amino acid transporter
 Solute carrier family

References

Further reading 

 
 
 
 
 
 
 
 
 
 
 
 
 
 
 
 
 
 
 
 
 

Solute carrier family